Zhanna Vladimirovna Bichevskaya (born June 17, 1944) is a prominent Russian singer and folk musician.

She was born in Moscow. In 1971 she graduated from the Moscow Circus and Performing Arts School. She was a teacher of music in Zagorsk (Sergiev Posad). In the 1970s, Zhanna started to perform Russian folk songs and romances.

At that time she was influenced by Bulat Okudzhava, and she gained popularity in Russia and abroad with some critics dubbing her the Russian Joan Baez. Her unique style of music is described as Russian country-folk.

In the late 1980s and early 1990s, Zhanna Bichevskaya's songs began to have more political, nationalist and spiritual themes. She performed a series of White Guard officer's songs, as well as a series of patriotic, monarchist and religious songs, some times songs dedicated to the Romanov Holy Martyrs. The lyrics to the latter were composed by Father Roman, a priest of the Pskovo-Pechorsky Monastery. Her album "Hieromonk Romans's songs" was blessed by him in 1997.

In 1999, Zhanna also became the host of her own show on Voice of Russia radio station. She was awarded People’s Artist of the RSFSR.

Discography
 Link to selected CDs
 Господа офицеры: 1994
 Life is too short, Слишком короток век: 1997, link to CD
 Songs of Bulat Okudzhava, link to CD
 Great, brothers, great... Любо, братцы, любо…: 1997, Link to CD
 Songs of Hieromonk Roman, 1997, Link to CD
 Жанна Бичевская поёт песни: 1997
 To Your Name, Lord: 1998
 Autumn of musician: 1998
 Русская Голгофа: 1998
 Russian folk songs and ballads: disk 1, disk 2, disk 3, disk 4: 1998
 Жанна Бичевская поёт песни Булата Окуджавы : 1999
 Tzar Nikolai: 1999
 Верую: 2000
 We are Russians, Songs of Gennadiy Ponomarev: 2001
 Black Raven: 2002
 Боже, храни своих: 2003
 К-141: 2004
 Белая ночь. Жанна Бичевская поёт песни: 2005
 Я расскажу тебе... Романсы: 2007
 Гори, гори, моя звезда: 2008
 Засуха: 2010

References

External links
  Official website
 Her site in Vkontakte
  Zhanna Bichevskaya’s Biography in English
  Zhanna Bichevskaya’s Biography in Russian
  Zhanna Bichevskaya' songs on Voskres.ru
  Zhanna Bichevskaya' songs on ruek.narod.ru (free songs in MP3 format)
  Zhanna Bichevskaya's Albums in Korean (7LPs & 22CDs)

1944 births
Living people
Singers from Moscow
Russian bards
Soviet women singers
Soviet songwriters
People's Artists of the RSFSR
Honored Artists of the RSFSR
Recipients of the Lenin Komsomol Prize
Russian monarchists
20th-century Russian women singers
20th-century Russian singers